National Route 496 is a national highway of Japan connecting between Yukuhashi, Fukuoka and Hita, Oita in Japan, with total length has 68.9 km (42.8 mi).

References

496
Roads in Fukuoka Prefecture
Roads in Ōita Prefecture